Paradise Island is a 1930 American pre-Code adventure film directed by Bert Glennon and starring Kenneth Harlan, Marceline Day, and Tom Santschi.

Cast
 Kenneth Harlan as Jim Thorne 
 Marceline Day as Ellen Bradford 
 Tom Santschi as Dutch Mike Lutze 
 Paul Hurst as Beauty 
 Betty Boyd as Poppi 
 Victor Potel as Swede 
 Gladden James as Roy Armstrong 
 Will Stanton as Limey

References

Bibliography
 Pitts, Michael R. Poverty Row Studios, 1929–1940: An Illustrated History of 55 Independent Film Companies, with a Filmography for Each. McFarland & Company, 2005.

External links

 

1930 films
1930 adventure films
American adventure films
Films directed by Bert Glennon
Films set in Oceania
Tiffany Pictures films
American black-and-white films
1930s English-language films
1930s American films
English-language adventure films